= List of Cardiff Rugby seasons =

This article lists the seasons played by Cardiff Rugby from 2003, when they formed. The list details the club's achievements in senior league and cup competitions, and the top scorers for each season.

== Seasons ==
Season	Celtic League								Heineken Cup	Anglo-Welsh Cup	European Challenge Cup
Season	P	W	D	L	F	A	Pts	Pos	Heineken Cup	Anglo-Welsh Cup	European Challenge Cup
2003-04	22	11	0	11	570	467	54	6th	Pool		
2004-05	20	8	1	11	350	404	40	9th	Pool		
2005-06	22	11	0	9	475	389	63	4th	Pool	Group	
2006-07	20	13	1	6	447	327	63	2nd	Pool	SF	
2007-08	18	12	0	6	395	315	56	2nd	QF	Group	
2008-09	18	8	1	9	322	361	38	6th	SF	W	
2009-10	18	10	0	8	349	315	44	5th	Pool	SF	W

== Key ==
Key to league record:

- P = Played
- W = Games won
- D = Games drawn
- L = Games lost
- F = Points for
- A = Points against
- Pts = Points
- Pos = Final position

Key to rounds:

- QR = Qualifying round
- Group = Group Stages
- QF = Quarter-finals
- SF = Semi-finals
- RU = Runners-up
- W = Winners

Champions	Runners-up
